Antonio Alfaro (born 13 June 1956) is a Mexican equestrian. He competed in the individual eventing at the 1992 Summer Olympics.

References

External links
 

1956 births
Living people
Mexican male equestrians
Olympic equestrians of Mexico
Equestrians at the 1992 Summer Olympics
Place of birth missing (living people)